is a Japanese manga series created by Go Nagai that originally ran in the magazine Weekly Shōnen Champion. Some of its characters returned with different names as part of other series, such as Cutie Honey, UFO Robot Grendizer and Mazinger Angels Z among others.

The OVA was brought to North America by ADV Films in 1995.

The manga was also adapted into a live-action film released in 2009.

Plot
The series deals with the adventures of the Abashiri family, a clan of criminals who are feared by the police and other criminals alike, as they are a destructive force to be reckoned with. Although they are virtually unstoppable, they do not have great desires and many of their plans are normally minor and sometimes get undone by their own foolishness. That is unless they are attacked, at which point they will retaliate with full force, normally with deadly consequences for their enemies.

As the series progress the tone of the series becomes less crime-focused and becomes more a gag comedy with strong touches of eroticism. The series was originally conceived by Nagai as a form of protest and parody of the controversy that arose with Harenchi Gakuen. While having a grim tone at the beginning, the series lightens up as it progresses, although the graphic violence remains through most of it but becoming less frequent.

The series remained popular in its original run until Nagai decided to drop it along with other series that he was doing at the time in order to concentrate on the Devilman manga. Years later, a single one-shot story was published and has since been included in all new tankōbon series. A special crossover one-shot with Cutie Honey was also published in 2009, in commemoration of the 40 years anniversary of the magazine Shōnen Champion, where both series debuted in manga.

Characters

 The head of the family. An old and small man, father of the other four, each one of them from a different mother (each one with a similar appearance to the sons). He acts as the leader and is the most powerful of them, though he normally only displays his true power when his sons and daughter are in danger.

 The daughter of the family. She is the most adept to close combat fights and the one that normally loses her clothes during the series. Stories in the series often revolve around her.

 The expert thief of the family and the oldest son. His main hobby is doing lecherous things and peeping at women, particularly at his sister. Later in the manga, he adopts a pseudo-heroic identity disguised with a mask and a horn on his crotch. He was modeled after Go Nagai's former assistant, Ken Ishikawa.

 The second oldest son and the powerhouse of the family. He's the most physically powerful of the family as well as the biggest, being a cyborg. In the first chapters he was depicted as a gangster with a prosthetic right leg. It was later shown that he is actually a cyborg whose every limb can be detached to use guns. Later in the manga, he is no longer depicted as a gangster with a prosthetic limb and rarely depicted as a cyborg; instead he is shown more like a typical strongman.

 The youngest member of the family, a small kid with a mean look. While not a fighter like Kikunosuke or Naojiro, he is an expert in explosives, using mostly his special disguise.

Manga
It has since then been republished in tankōbon format several times.

Akita Shoten (Shōnen Champion Comics, 1970–1973, reprinted in 1997)

Akita Shoten (Akita Manga Bunko, 1977–1978, reprinted in 1990)

Akita Shoten (Akita Comics Selection, 1985–1987)

Kadokawa Bunko (Kadokawa Shoten, 1997)

King Series Manga Super Wide (Koike Shoin, 2009)

Additionally, the series is also available in ebook format, published by ebookjapan.

Short stories 
It has since then been included in most compilations as the last story.

As the title implies, characters of both series interact with each other and the relationship of Daemon with both series is central to the plot. This one-shot was published as part of the 40th anniversary of the magazine, which was the same where both series were originally published.

OVA

Plot 
The four Abashiri prepare to rob a large bank as their last work. This bank, however, is in reality a trap by the police, which is ready to expend every necessary resource to end with the Abashiri. Although apparently cornered, the Abashiri overwhelm the police and kill or badly injure several of the policemen. They use so much power that they also destroy a large part of their loot.

After they return to their home, Daemon informs them the reason behind their retirement. Kikunosuke, whom the rest her brothers considered a boy, is actually a girl. For generations the Abashiri believed to have been cursed because no female child had been in the family until the arrival of Kikunosuke. This prompts her mother to request Daemon to stop the criminal activities of the family after Kikunosuke reaches a certain age. Her brothers are surprised by this revelation and the lecherous Goemon takes a special interest in her sister. Daemon intends to send her to a private school where she can become a proper lady. Although Kikunosuke originally refuses, Daemon tricks her into saying that she would try it and forces her to go, under the identity of Shiratori.

The Paradise school, however, turns out to be a criminal school where students have to fight for their survival. Thanks to her strength, she manages to overcome the teachers. At the same time, her brother Goemon is so fixated with seeing her naked that he decides to secretly look for her at her new school. Kikunosuke is able to make a new friend, Yukiko, another girl, who, unlike Kikunosuke, is completely defenseless against the teachers and other students.

For standing up against the teachers, one of them plans to kill Kikunosuke but she easily kills him. He's able however to recognize her true identity and pass the message among the other teachers. As she runs to rescue Yukiko, she realizes that she won't be able to beat all the teachers by herself and ask for help. With the help of the leader of the students, a revolt is formed and the school director orders to kill them all.

Daemon realizes the danger in which Kikunosuke is and with his sons goes to save her. Meanwhile, Goemon manages to arrive to her school only to find Yukiko captive and get himself caught. The students and Kikunosuke (despite being injured) fight all opposition and despite losing several students, are holding on. It's revealed then that the student's leader has been preparing to take the school for himself. The rest of the Abashiri also enter the fight and Daemon recognizes the true identity of the director, Danjuro Namakubi, whom he has fought already two times in the past. The director is able to easily defeat Naojiro. By this point, the students' leader has already betrayed Kikunosuke and uses Goemon and Yukiko as hostages in order to subdue her. Daemon is able to kill the director, but has to surrender to the students leader because he holds Kikunosuke and Goemon while killing Yukiko, who tried to free Kikunosuke.

As the Abashiri are about to be executed, the remaining Abashiri, Kichiza, enters abruptly and with his special explosive costume manages to kill most of the leader's gang and free Kikunosuke, but leaves alive the leader in order to let Kikunosuke deal with him. An enraged Kikunosuke shows no mercy and uses her most powerful technique, the Abashiri 8 God attack, with which she kills the leader in the most painful way. The experience lived makes Kikunosuke cry and Daemon consoles her.

Years later, and old Daemon is shown watching his grandson (named also Kikunosuke) practice the Abashiri 8 God attack while her mother, Kikunosuke arrives, now being a normal woman and thus fulfilling Daemon's wish of her having a peaceful normal life.

Episodes

Releases

Anime V Comic Rentaman 
The OVA was originally released as part of Studio Pierrot's video magazine show  along with Yumemakura Baku Twilight Gekijo, Eguchi Hisashi no Kotobuki Goro Show and Akai Hayate. The Rentaman experimental concept consisted of these anime divided in episodic short serials. For this reason, the running time of each episode varies greatly. Rentaman was only released on VHS format and published under the Nextart label (Pony Canyon).

Additional releases in Japan 

Releases outside Japan

Staff and cast 
Distributor: Nextart (Pony Canyon)
Original work: Go Nagai
Director/storyboards: Takashi Watanabe
Character design/animation director: Shigeki Awai
Art director: Hitoshi Nagao
Music director: Yoshikazu Iwanami
Music: Takeo Miratsu
Producer: Yukina Hiiro, Shigenori Kurii
Production: Dynamic Planning, Studio Pierrot
Theme song:  (lyrics by Yumi Morita, composition by Daijiro Nozawa, arrangement by Satoru Osanai, song by Kyoko Tongu)
Cast: Kyoko Tongu (Kikunosuke), Kosei Tomita (Daemon), Shigeru Chiba (Goemon), Taiki Matsuno (Kichiza), Tessho Genda (Naojiro)
Source(s)

Live-action film 
A live-action film titled , starring actress Erika Tonooka (member of the group Idoling!!!) and directed by Teruyoshi Ishii, was released in Tokyo on November 21, 2009.

Staff and cast 
Studio: Total Media Corporation (TMC), Oscar
Director: Teruyoshi Ishii
Action director: Shingo Nishida
Producer: Seiji Nanba, Hideo Iwashita
Co-producer: Akio Motojima
Assistant producer: Eisuke Ito, Shinichiro Yamaguchi
Executive adviser: Jun Mimae
Executive producer: Akihiko Yahata, Tsuguo Oikawa
Planning: Takashi Shiotsuki
Original work: Go Nagai
Script: Sadayuki Murai
Photography: Takehiro Kuramochi
Editor: Hiroaki Niizuma
Art: Nori Fukuda
Lighting: Koji Hara
Audio recording: Manabu Otsuka
Production: Abashiri Family Production Committee
Theme song: string (performed by eroica)
Cast: Erica Tonooka (Kikunosuke), Shun Sugata (Daemon), Ijiri Okada (Goemon), Yakan Nabe (Kichiza), Kyoji Kamui (Naojiro), Jiro Sato (Danjuro Namakubi), Miwa (Kaoruko Unii/Mademoiselle Honey), Maria Yoshikawa (Yuki), Mai Endo (Mai)
Source(s)

Legacy
The characters Daemon, Goemon, Kichiza, and Naojiro would all appear in Go Nagai's later series Cutie Honey. In it, Daemon became Hayami Danbei and Kichiza became Hayami Junpei. Naojiro later appeared as Danbei's nephew, and boss of Paradise School. Goemon appeared with Naojiro as a teacher of Paradise School.

Kikunosuke is in the Mazinger Angels manga as the pilot for Iron Z (which is in fact a new name for Energer Z, the Mazinger Z prototype). As well as traditional Mazinger and Grendizer characters Sayaka Yumi, Grace Maria Fleed, Hikaru Makiba and Jun Hono, as they fight Dr. Hell's forces and the Vegan Empire, respectively, Daemon also materializes under his Hayami Danbei alias in Grendizer.  In Shin Mazinger, Cross, a cyborg similar to Naojiro, and his 'robot' form, have the same physical look to that of Naojiro.

References

External links
Abashiri Ikka at The World of Go Nagai webpage 
OVA review
OVA review

Abashiri Ikka: The movie at allcinema 

1969 manga
1992 anime OVAs
Action anime and manga
ADV Films
Akita Shoten manga
Comedy anime and manga
Crime in anime and manga
Go Nagai
Pierrot (company)
Shōnen manga
Japanese comedy films
Japanese action films